The 2006 Ottawa municipal election was held on November 13, 2006, in Ottawa, Canada, to elect the mayor of Ottawa, Ottawa City Council and the Ottawa-Carleton Public and Catholic School Boards. The election was one of many races across the province of Ontario. See 2006 Ontario municipal elections.

The race featured three main candidates: incumbent mayor Bob Chiarelli, former Kanata councillor Alex Munter and businessman Larry O'Brien. The race began as a fight between Chiarelli and Munter, with Munter getting the edge and 2003 candidate Terry Kilrea in a close third. However, in the summer O'Brien joined the campaign, prompting Kilrea to drop out and endorse Chiarelli. However, most of Kilrea's support went to O'Brien, creating a tight three-way race. Chiarelli's support then got pulled away from the right by O'Brien and to the left by Munter and was eventually depleted, and by the last weekend before the election, O'Brien had caught up to Munter and led for the first time. This lead carried through on election day.

In the end, Munter could only win his core areas in the central part of the city, plus his former home of Kanata, while O'Brien won the rest of the city—suburban areas and the rural areas (where he did especially well). Chiarelli did not win any wards, but he did finish second in Gloucester-South Nepean with 28%. This area of the city was where his O-Train proposal was going to be built.

Results

Voter turn-out
The 2006 municipal election had one of the highest voter turn-out ratios in Ottawa's history, with 54%.

Mayor

* : Last known residence

City council

Dropped out
Kitchissippi Ward (Ward 15)
 Daniel Stringer
 Shawn Little
College Ward (Ward 8)
 Dana Barnett withdrew as per her Media Release dated Sept. 6, 2006.
Kanata South (Ward 23)
 Noel Z. Gondek withdrew and on Sept. 29, 2006.

Ottawa-Carleton District School Board Trustees

Ottawa-Carleton Catholic School Board Trustees

Conseil des écoles catholiques de langue française du Centre-Est Trustees

Conseil des écoles publiques de l'Est de l'Ontario Trustees

Candidates for mayor

Registered candidates
Piotr Anweiler: Local businessman. President of AplusB Software Corporation.

Bob Chiarelli: Incumbent mayor, has been mayor of Ottawa since 2001, and was regional chair of the Regional Municipality of Ottawa-Carleton prior. He is also a former Liberal Member of Provincial Parliament.

Robert Larter: Unknown candidate. The Ottawa Citizen reported his registered phone number was traceable to an apartment in Vanier, from where he moved away during the summer. The Citizen was unable to contact him.

Alex Munter: Former city councillor in Kanata (1991–1994), regional councillor (1994–2000) and former Ottawa city councillor (2000–2003). Ran for the Ontario New Democratic Party in Carleton in the 1990 election. Openly gay, Munter was also the co-ordinator for Canadians for Equal Marriage.

Larry O'Brien: Chairman and former CEO of Calian Technologies Ltd., an Ottawa-based company that sells technology services to industry and government.

Barkley Pollock: Twenty-seven-year-old wants to look at the possibility of a municipal income tax to increase money for the poor. Campaigned for Liberal Richard Mahoney in Ottawa Centre in the 2004 and 2006 federal elections.

Jane Scharf: Local poverty activist. She has been arrested more than once including an arrest during the Homeless Action Strike on City Hall. All charges were dropped.

Dropped out
Don Rivington: A single-issue candidate who wants an ombudsman for the city. Ran for city council in the 2003 election in Bay Ward but lost. Dropped out of the Orléans Ward by-election in 2006.

Terry Kilrea: Placed second in the 2003 election. Kilrea is generally regarded as a conservative. He ran for the Conservative Party of Canada's nomination race in Ottawa South in the 2004 election but lost. Withdrew on August 30, 2006 and will endorse Chiarelli. Will run as councillor candidate in Bay Ward against Alex Cullen.

Not running
Diane Deans, city councillor. running for re-election in Gloucester-Southgate Ward
Jan Harder, city councillor.  running for re-election in Barrhaven Ward
Brian McGarry, CEO of Hulse, Playfair & McGarry funeral homes.

Poll results

? indicates statistic not stated/unknown
— indicates candidate's name not included in polling question
* indicates poll release date - actual polling date(s) unknown
^ indicates percentage of decided voters only
†2 indicates percentage of votes for Piotr Anweiller, Robert Larter, Barkley Pollock and Jane Scharf
† indicates percentage of votes for Piotr Anweiller, Barkley Pollock and Jane Scharf
1 Source: Ottawa Sun, 30 April 2005

Endorsements

Bob Chiarelli
Jean-Jacques Blais, former MP
Marlene Catterall, former MP
Guy Cousineau, former mayor of Vanier
Clive Doucet, city councillor
Jim Durrell, former mayor
Lee Farnworth, former Nepean city councillor
Brian Ford, former police chief
Bernard Grandmaître, former mayor of Vanier
Mac Harb, Senator
Jan Harder, city councillor
Terry Kilrea, former mayoral candidate
David McGuinty, MP
Maria McRae, city councillor
Bob Monette, city councillor
Jim Watson, MPP
Ottawa Sun
Ottawa Citizen

Alex Munter
Norm Atkins, Senator
Mauril Bélanger, MP
Ed Broadbent, former leader of the NDP
Claudette Boyer, former MPP
Michael Cassidy, former leader of the Ontario NDP
Alex Cullen, city councillor
Marion Dewar, former mayor
Paul Dewar, MP
Peggy Feltmate, city councillor
John Godfrey, MP
Diane Holmes, city councillor
John Manley, former MP
Monia Mazigh, former NDP candidate, wife of Maher Arar
Simon Pulsifer, prolific Wikipedian
Janet Stavinga, outgoing city councillor
Pat Woodcock, professional football player
Le Droit
Ottawa Life

Larry O'Brien
Piotr Anweiler, mayoral candidate
Glenn Brooks, city councillor
Art Eggleton, former MP
Jacquelin Holzman, former mayor
Gord Hunter, city councillor
Merle Nicholds, former mayor of Kanata
Gordon O'Connor, MP
Pierre Poilievre, MP
Tim Power, Conservative Party strategist
Marianne Wilkinson, former mayor of Kanata

Jane Scharf
John Dunn, Executive Director, The Foster Care Council of Canada

Timeline
June 21, 2005 - Brian McGarry announces he will not run for mayor, as he fears the right-wing vote would be split with Terry Kilrea. ottsun.canoe.ca
September 9, 2005 - Orléans Ward Councillor Herb Kreling resigns his seat to become Justice of the Peace. orleansonline.ca
October 7, 2005 - the Ontario Municipal Board rules in favour of the new ward boundary proposal that was being fought by mostly rural residents. ottawasun.com
January 3, 2006 - First day of nominations. Chiarelli, Kilrea and Rivington file nomination papers for mayor.
January 9, 2006 - Bob Monette is elected in the by-election to replace Herb Kreling.
February 13, 2006 - Munter declares his intention to run for mayor. cbc.ca
April 11, 2006 - City Councillor Janet Stavinga announces she will not be running for re-election. janetstavinga.com
May 2, 2006 - Pollock declares his intention to run for mayor. cfra.com
June 1, 2006 - Anweiler declares his intention to run for mayor. anweiler.ca
June 13, 2006 - Gloucester-Southgate Councillor Diane Deans declares that she will not run for mayor and instead decided to run for re-election. (Ottawa Citizen, June 14)
July 26, 2006 - High-tech businessman Larry O'Brien announces his intention to run for the mayoralty as a "centrist candidate," planning to file his nomination papers within a few weeks. cbc.ca
August 8, 2006 - O'Brien fills out nomination papers.
August 30, 2006 - Kilrea drops out of the race.
September 12, 2006 - First mayoral debate
September 13, 2006 - Councillor Shawn Little drops out of his city council race
September 14, 2006 - Election signs can legally be put up.
September 28, 2006 - Robert Larter files his nomination papers.
September 29, 2006 - Nominations close.
October 10, 2006 - John Baird, president of the federal Treasury Board, announced that the 200M$ promised from the federal government for the O-Train project would not be given until the new elected council approves the project.
October 23, 2006 - A-Channel debate.
November 13, 2006 - Election day.
8:00PM - Polls close.
8:30PM - A-Channel recognizes Larry O'Brien as the new Mayor of the City of Ottawa
8:50PM - Bob Chiarelli arrives at Larry O'Brien's campaign headquarters, and officially names Larry O'Brien as new Mayor of the City of Ottawa

Issues
Bilingualism in Ottawa
Budget difficulties
Amalgamation
Homelessness
Pesticide Bylaw ottawa.ca
Public transportation, LRT and in particular O-Train expansion controversies
Rising property taxes
Safety issues
Taxes
Ward boundary changes

Ward boundary changes

New ward boundaries were drawn for the 2006 election.  Under the new plan, the size of city council will be increased by two members. The boundary commission made the following proposal that was adopted by city council:

Orléans Ward 1
Innes Ward 2
Barrhaven Ward 3 (drastically decreased in size, formerly Bell-South Nepean Ward.)
Kanata North Ward 4 (formerly Kanata Ward)
West Carleton Ward 5 (added rural parts from Kanata)
Stittsville-Kanata West Ward 6 (New ward, formerly Goulbourn Ward)
Bay Ward 7
College Ward 8 (Formerly Baseline Ward. Added neighbourhoods of Bells Corners and Crestview)
Knoxdale-Merivale Ward 9 (added suburbs south of Hunt Club Road)
Gloucester-Southgate Ward 10 (made significantly smaller. Includes now only Hunt Club and Blossom Park)
Beacon Hill-Cyrville Ward 11
Rideau-Vanier Ward 12
Rideau-Rockcliffe Ward 13
Somerset Ward 14
Kitchissippi Ward 15
River Ward 16 (losses Macdonald-Cartier airport and Ellwood)
Capital Ward 17
Alta Vista Ward 18
Cumberland Ward 19 (added rural parts from Gloucester)
Osgoode Ward 20 (added rural parts from Gloucester)
Rideau-Goulbourn Ward 21 (amalgamation of Rideau Ward and Goulbourn Ward. Added rural parts from Nepean, lost Stittsville)
Gloucester-South Nepean Ward 22 (New) (created from parts of Bell-South Nepean and Gloucester-Southgate.)
Kanata South Ward 23 (New) (created from south part of Kanata ward.)

References

External links
Ward 8 Candidate Laura Lee Doupe Passed Away
Arts Vote 2006
Ward boundary review
Candidates
Candidate and Incumbent Ratings on Environmental Issues
Pesticide Bylaw Issue
Pesticide Bylaw Stance of Candidates
Ottawa Elections
Ottawa Start Election Guide
City of Ottawa - Elections 2006
CBC Ottawa Votes 2006
Ottawa Sun coverage
CKCU FM Podcasted Election Interviews

Municipal elections in Ottawa
2006 Ontario municipal elections
election, 2006